European (as well as Japanese and Chinese) colonial administrators had historically been responsible for the territory of French Indochina, an area equivalent to modern-day Vietnam, Laos, Cambodia, and the Chinese city of Zhanjiang.

List of governors-general
The following have held the position of governor-general of French Indochina.

Pre–1945

Post–1945

See also 
 French Indochina

Notes

References

External links
Alexandre Varenne in Indochina

 
Indochina
Vietnam politics-related lists
Laos history-related lists
Lists of office-holders in Cambodia